William Ellis Kinsley (born 28 November 1946) is an English musician, who was lead vocalist and bassist with The Merseybeats until 1966 (although he temporarily left the band both to form the Kinsleys) The group disbanded in January 1966 to resurface as a duo called The Merseys. They recorded The McCoys' song "Sorrow" (also covered by David Bowie on his 1973 cover album, Pin Ups) with the band before embarking on a solo career, where he recorded "Bye Bye Baby" (not to be confused with a Four Seasons track of a similar title), a typical Merseybeat tune, followed by the singles "Annabella", and "You Make My Day". 

Kinsley was born in Anfield, Liverpool. His session work notably included working for Apple Records (alongside George Harrison on at least one song for Jackie Lomax). He also worked on the popular Top of the Pops record series, which contained anonymous cover versions of recent and current hit singles. During this time he worked with fellow musician friend, Jimmy Campbell, and formed the band Rockin' Horse. They recorded one album and toured England and Europe as the backing band for Chuck Berry.

Kinsley later formed Liverpool Express in the mid-1970s, and again experienced chart success with "You Are My Love", mentioned by Paul McCartney as one of his favourite love songs, plus "Every Man Must Have A Dream", "Dreamin", "Hold Tight", and "Smile". They toured the UK and Europe supporting Rod Stewart, released more singles, and found popularity in South America (they were the first band to play large stadiums in Brazil). They had quite a few hit singles all over South America, and three of their singles ("You Are My Love", "Dreamin'", and "Every Man Must Have A Dream") reached No. 1 in the charts. In 1978, they played at the Royal Gala Performance at the request of Prince Charles, at the Empire Theatre in Liverpool. The following year, after three albums and more single releases, they had no further chart success.

Kinsley formed a side band, The Cheats, with members Kenny Parry (guitar), and Brian Rawling (drums), playing pubs and clubs in and around Merseyside. In the mid-1980s, Phil Chittuck joined the band in place of Rawling, and they released the following two singles (as Liverpool Express): "So What" and "If You're Out There". Kinsley later took on more session work. Then most notably he joined (with old friend Kenny Parry) The Pete Best Band, with whom he recorded a live album Live At The Adelphi (recorded in 1988), and on which he plays bass and sings lead vocal and is credited with "editing" (the album was not released until the 1990s) as well as working on a single ("Heaven").  In the mid-1990s, Kinsley re-joined The Merseybeats. In 1999, he once again joined The Pete Best Band and recorded Casbah Coffee Club, which he produced and sang lead vocal, played bass, and rhythm guitar (once again bringing along his friend Kenny Parry to play lead guitar on some tracks). Liverpool Express recorded an album in 2003, Once Upon a Time, which followed a best of album, and a single, a tribute to the Beatles, titled "John George Ringo & Paul".

In 2009, Spencer Leigh of BBC Radio Merseyside produced a four-part radio series about Kinsley's career, entitled It's Love That Really Counts, which featured interviews with Kinsley and others, and music from his career. A book was also issued under the same title, as well as a CD featuring new recordings.

References

External links

1946 births
Living people
English pop guitarists
English male guitarists
English male singers
English pop singers
Musicians from Liverpool
The Merseybeats members
Liverpool Express members